USS Codington (AK-173) was an  commissioned by the U.S. Navy for service in World War II. She was responsible for delivering troops, goods and equipment to locations in the war zone.

Construction
Codington was launched 29 November 1944, by Froemming Brothers, Inc., Milwaukee, Wisconsin, under a Maritime Commission contract, MC hull 2145; sponsored by Mrs. W. P. Plehl; and commissioned at Galveston, Texas, 23 July 1945.

Service history

World War II Pacific Theatre operations
Codington departed Galveston 11 August 1945 for Leyte, arriving 11 October. She assumed cargo operations in the Philippines, with one voyage to New Guinea, 1 – 27 December, until 30 January 1946, when she sailed from Subic Bay for Yokosuka.

Post-war decommissioning
Codington was decommissioned at Tokyo 27 February 1946, and transferred to the War Shipping Administration for disposal.

Merchant service
Codington was leased by Coastwise Line for Military Sea Transportation Service, 7 May 1956, then sold to a South Korean buyer, 27 May 1956, for $693,862. She was renamed Pohang, for the South Korean city of Pohang, and reflagged South Korean.

On 11 November 1972, while discharging her cargo at Phnom Penh, Cambodia, she was damaged by a mine. She was able to proceed to Singapore, for dry docking. She was finally scrapped at Kaohsiung, Taiwan, January 1974.

Notes 

Citations

Bibliography 

Online resources

External links

Alamosa-class cargo ships
Codington County, South Dakota
Ships built in Milwaukee
1944 ships
World War II auxiliary ships of the United States
Maritime incidents in 1974